Pumpkin Center, Oklahoma may refer to one of these small communities in Oklahoma:

Pumpkin Center, Cherokee County, Oklahoma
Pumpkin Center, Comanche County, Oklahoma
Pumpkin Center, Muskogee County, Oklahoma
Pumpkin Center, Okmulgee County, Oklahoma

See also
Pumpkin Center (disambiguation)